Armstrong Kalua (born April 29, 1990), professionally known as Onesimus Muzik, is a Malawi-born Afropop singer and songwriter.

Early life
Onesimus AKA African Butter started singing at the age of 13. His love for singing grew as he performed at different concerts around his community in Malawi. Apart from singing, Onesimus also has passion for dancing as he first gained expression at the age of 17 when his dance group God's soldiers won the Sprite competition in 2006.

Music career
He discovered his knack for lyrics in 2008 when he joined the rap group Blessed Beyond Measure (also BBM Clique) dropping tracks such as “By MySide” and “Random Thoughts” with the outfit. The artist was to venture into a solo career soon after, working on an unreleased hip-hop mixtape called “Beyond Limits” for a year in 2009 before he found his true calling, music. Armstrong started singing secular music in 2010 and finally released two singles: “Beautiful” featuring award-winning Malawian rapper Young Kay and “Without Your Love” which landed him a coveted deal with the record company ‘Nde’feyo Entertainment’. Almost instantly thereafter he began his tour in Malawi under the stable, in 2011. He dropped a R&B mixtape titled ‘BRB’ in 2012 and - in the same year - dropped his debut Afro R&B album: “Ndele”. In this album he showed his diversity as he also sings in his mother-tongue - Chichewa. By this time he had already worked with several of Malawi's urban music icons and also did a song called “Musiye Ayende” with Zambia's musicians Dalisoul and Afunika. He made appearances on many line-ups at acclaimed music festivals in Malawi sharing stages with the continent's industry giants: Oliver Mtukudzi, Freshlyground, Salif Keita, Professor, AKA, Naeto C.

Awards

References

External links

https://www.iol.co.za/entertainment/music/local/onesimus-lives-his-gospel-music-13263163
https://allafrica.com/view/group/main/main/id/00040581.html

1989 births
Living people
21st-century Malawian male singers